Alter Egos is a 2012 American superhero comedy film written, edited, and directed by Jordan Galland. The film, starring Kris Lemche, Sean Lennon, Danny Masterson, and Geneva Carr, was distributed by Kevin Smith's SModcast Pictures and Phase 4 Films. It premiered was at the Fantasia Film Festival on July 24, 2012, where it was chosen as an official selection.

Plot
The plot follows the misadventures of the Fridge, an under-appreciated superhero, at a time when superheroes have lost government funding and all public support. In a synopsis by Interview Magazine:

"Alter Egos inhabits a fantasy world where superheroes are a dime a dozen. If you have the powers, as lead supers Fridge (Kris Lemche), and C-Thru (Joey Kern), do, then, well, you can practice them for good, as long as you follow the guidelines, or at least some of them. Quite obviously, this is a parody of parodies and flips the superhero genre on its head. Like Superman, Fridge is dorky in his human clothes. Unlike Superman, it's not because he has to do so to keep his identity under wraps—more like he uses his superhero garb to explore different facets of his personality, as evidenced by the title. Somewhere along the storyline, he must tackle the fact that his girlfriend loves his superhero identity more than his unmasked self, and, naturally, face his nemesis, the man who killed his mom and dad—although he really doesn't want to."

Cast
 Kris Lemche as Brendan/"Fridge"
 Sean Lennon as "Electric Death"
 Danny Masterson as "Jimmy"
 Geneva Carr as Newscaster
 Joey Kern as "C-Thru"
 John Ventimiglia as Shrink
 Brooke Nevin as Claudel
 Christine Evangelista as Emily
 Kristina Klebe as "Ice Scream"
 Marina Squerciati as Dr. Sara Bella
 Aurélie Claudel as Rich woman
 Carlos Velazquez III as Moon Dog

Production
Musician Sean Lennon, besides playing "Electric Death", also contributed the musical score for this film. Galland and Lennon have been friends for around 15 years, and have collaborated on each other's albums. Lennon also scored Galland's 2009 feature,  Rosencrantz and Guildenstern Are Undead, and also worked with Galland on his award-winning debut short, surreal film Smile for the Camera.

Music
Rolling Stone editor Matthew Perpetua discusses the process of developing the soundtrack of Alter Egos in an interview with Sean Lennon. Oh No They Didn't states the following: "Lennon, who also makes a cameo as a super villain, began working on the project earlier this summer, composing what Galland describes as "an epic superhero sound."

In Variety, in an interview with Sean Lennon, he discusses the blending of various genres for the soundtrack "When it came time for writer/director Jordan Galland to give his friend and musical colleague Sean Lennon instruction on scoring his indie film, "Alter Egos," Galland recalls requesting "something that feels like 'Twin Peaks' at times and that feels like it's harnessing the power of 'The Dark Knight' at times." Twitch Film Premiered the Trailer on its website, and editor Todd Brown had the following to say about it: "While I won't spoil the cause of the 'emotional crisis' here — it's contained in the trailer and is pretty damn fantastic — this whole thing just oozes style and charm and a sense of comedy based in wit and a sincere love for the genre. Galland takes himself in some new directions here while still preserving the unique voice that made Rosencrantz an indie hit."

Release
Daniel Schechter, a personal friend of Galland's, did the trailer in exchange for Galland providing the soundtrack for Supporting Characters. The trailer was featured on Hipster GeekChicDaily.

Popular online magazine Interview featured Alter Egos in its "Thursday Trailer Face off" on January 12, 2012, against the upcoming big budget movie G.I. Joe: Retaliation, with Alter Egos winning all categories and tying in one.

The film has grossed over $1 million on VOD.

Accolades
The film won the Best Narrative Feature at Bay City, Michigan's Hell's Half Mile Film & Music Festival.

References

External links
 
 

2012 films
2012 comedy films
American independent films
American superhero comedy films
2010s English-language films
2010s superhero comedy films
SModcast Pictures films
2012 independent films
2010s American films